In mathematics, a sequence of vectors (xn) in a Hilbert space  is called a Riesz sequence if there exist constants  such that

for all sequences of scalars  (an) in the ℓp space ℓ2.  A Riesz sequence is called a Riesz basis if

 .

Theorems
If H is a finite-dimensional space, then every basis of H is a Riesz basis.

Let  be in the Lp space L2(R), let

Then the following are equivalent:

See also
 Orthonormal basis
 Hilbert space
 Frame of a vector space

References
 
 

Functional analysis